Wallace Clarence "Wally" Crouter (August 5, 1923 – March 28, 2016) was a Canadian radio broadcaster best known for his career at CFRB radio in Toronto, spanning exactly half a century, most of which was spent as the station's top-rated morning man.

Early years

Crouter was born and raised in Lindsay, Ontario and made his debut radio broadcast on Toronto radio station CKGW in 1932 as a nine-year-old, award-winning 'boy soprano'.

Crouter served in the Canadian Army in World War II with the Army Show radio, with postings in Britain, Rome, Paris and North Africa. He spent a year in hospital recovering from shrapnel wounds.

Radio career

After the war Crouter joined CFRB on November 1, 1946 after a brief stint at radio station CHEX AM1430 in Peterborough, Ontario, near his hometown.

At the height of his influence in the 1970s and 80s, Mr. Crouter had the highest-rated show in the city and his name was known across the country. According to his son Glenn, the key to his father's success was to avoid any topic that could potentially divide an audience like sex, politics or religion - both on and off the air. About the reason for his own success, Wally Crouter said, "I always tried to put myself in the place of the listener. … It's the most personal time of the day. The radio is on while you're doing your morning ablutions, getting dressed, having breakfast with the kids coming to the table. … I've had a surgeon write me to tell me that, when he had three serious operations to do in a day, he started off by listening to my show so he could achieve the right relaxation and focus he needed."

On November 1, 1996, exactly 50 years to the day of his start with CFRB, Crouter, who would be known as Canada's longest serving radio morning man, retired. He was subsequently inducted into the Canadian Broadcast Hall of Fame. Wally Crouter Walkway, located off Yonge Street north of St. Clair Avenue behind the former offices of CFRB, was named after the broadcaster.

Death

Crouter died in his sleep on March 28, 2016  at Sunnybrook Hospital in Toronto.

He is survived by sons Dale and Glenn, who was also a broadcaster, his wife Lynne, daughter Janice, and 5 grandchildren.

Quotations
 "Before you put your foot down, make sure you've got a leg to stand on." -A Thought of the Day from a Wally Crouter broadcast.

References

External links
 CAB Hall of Fame profile
  CTV News

1923 births
2016 deaths
Canadian talk radio hosts
People from Kawartha Lakes